The Cabinet of Cape Verde consists of the Prime Minister of Cape Verde and 12 Cabinet Ministers. Cape verde has a parliamentary system and ministers formulate the government's policies and advises the National Assembly.

Current Cabinet

See also
 Politics of Cape Verde

References

External links

Cape Verde
Politics of Cape Verde
Political organizations based in Cape Verde